Chithi means mother's younger sister, or father's younger brother's wife, or father's second wife in Tamil. In Indian English, it may refer to aunty (friendly older woman)

Chithi, Chitthi, or variation, may also refer to:

 Chithi (TV series), a 1999 Tamil television series on Sun TV
 Chithi 2, a 2020 Tamil reboot of the 1999 series 
 Chitthi, a 1966 Tamil language film

See also

 
 Chitti (disambiguation)
 Chiti (disambiguation)
 
 
 
 
 Citti (surname)